Xoʻjaobod (also spelled as Khodjaabad) is a town in Andijan Region, Uzbekistan. It is the administrative center of Xoʻjaobod District. Its population was 12,831 in 1989, and 20,200 in 2016.

Xoʻjaobod is the site of the Dustlik border crossing leading to Osh, Kyrgyzstan, which has been unused in recent years.

References

Populated places in Andijan Region
Cities in Uzbekistan